Walter Green (25 February 1918 – 11 December 2006) was an international motorcycle speedway rider who finished second in the World Championship final in 1950.

Career

Green started his career with the West Ham Hammers in 1946 after being spotted at a training school run by Dicky Case. He was not a regular in the side at that time, so in 1947 he was loaned to the Eastbourne Eagles where he won the National League Division Three championship and finished as the Eagles' top rider.  He was still making a few appearances for the Hammers.

When the Eastbourne closed down at the end of 1947 he moved with the promotion along the south coast to Hastings with the Saxons. Green set the track record at Hastings and in the opening meeting on 21 April 1948, he won all six of his rides. He again finished the season as the top rider. His form did not go unnoticed by West Ham star Aub Lawson and in 1948 he returned to the Hammers full-time.

In 1949, he made steady progress and became a team regular. Green made his only appearance in a World final in 1950 and finished second, just a point behind the winner Freddie Williams. Again in 1950 he was second in the West Ham averages. He also captained England in 1954.

Green stayed with the Hammers for the rest of his career. The club closed in 1955 and Green retired in the same season due to ill health.

World Final appearances 
 1950 –  London, Wembley Stadium – 2nd – 13pts

Bike building
Green was a renowned bike frame builder whose business was based in Hendon. He built frames to order and could name racing cyclist Alf Engers as a customer.

References

External links
 Wally Green
 Pictures of a Wally Green bicycle

1918 births
2007 deaths
British speedway riders
West Ham Hammers riders
Eastbourne Eagles riders
British cycle designers